Refanezumab (GSK249320) is a monoclonal antibody designed for the recovery of motor function after stroke.

This drug was developed by GlaxoSmithKline.

References 

Monoclonal antibodies